This page lists a discography of albums and extended plays released under or distributed by Def Jam Recordings, a division of Universal Music Group, which had been created in 1984. Records distributed by another label, but released under Def Jam, are also included or otherwise reviewed. Also included are albums or EPs that were released under Rush Associated Labels and subsidiaries like Original Black Recordings, DJ West, Def Soul, Disturbing tha Peace, Def Jam South, Roc-A-Fella Records, Murder Inc. Records, and GOOD Music.

1980s

1983

1984

1985

1986

1987

1988

1989

1990s

1990

1991

1992

1993

1994

1995

1996

1997

1998

1999

2000s

2000

2001

2002

2003

2004

2005

2006

2007

Beanie Sigel – The Solution (State Property/Roc-A-Fella/Def Jam/IDJMG)
Bobby Valentino – Special Occasion (DTP/Def Jam/IDJMG)
Chingy – Hate It or Love It (DTP/Slot-A-Lot/Def Jam/IDJMG)
Chrisette Michele – I Am
Fabolous – From Nothin' to Somethin' (Desert Storm/Def Jam/IDJMG)
Freeway – Free at Last (Roc-A-Fella/G-Unit/Def Jam/IDJMG)
Ghostface Killah – The Big Doe Rehab (Starks Enterprises/Def Jam/IDJMG)
Jay-Z – American Gangster (Roc-A-Fella/Def Jam/IDJMG)
Kanye West – Graduation (Roc-A-Fella/Def Jam/IDJMG)
Ne-Yo – Because of You
Pittsburgh Slim – Tastemaker
Playaz Circle – Supply & Demand (DTP/Def Jam/IDJMG)
Redman – Red Gone Wild (Def Squad/Gillahouse/Def Jam/IDJMG)
Rihanna – Good Girl Gone Bad (SRP/Def Jam/IDJMG)
The-Dream – Love Hate (Radio Killa/Def Jam/IDJMG)
USDA – Young Jeezy Presents USDA: Cold Summer (Corporate Thugz/Def Jam/IDJMG)

2008
Ace Hood – Gutta (We the Best/Def Jam/IDJMG)
Blood Raw – My Life: The True Testimony (Corporate Thugz/Def Jam/IDJMG)
Kanye West – 808s & Heartbreak (Roc-A-Fella/Def Jam/IDJMG)
Karina Pasian – First Love (Def Jam/IDJMG)
LL Cool J – Exit 13 (Def Jam/IDJMG)
Mariah Carey – E=MC² (Island/IDJMG)
Ludacris – Theater of the Mind (DTP/Def Jam/IDJMG)
Nas – Untitled (The Jones Experience/Def Jam/IDJMG)
Ne-Yo – Year of the Gentleman (Def Jam/IDJMG)
Rick Ross – Trilla (Slip-N-Slide/Def Jam/IDJMG)
Rihanna – Good Girl Gone Bad: Reloaded (SRP/Def Jam/IDJMG)
Rocko - Self-Made (Rocky Road/So So Def/Def Jam/IDJMG)
The Roots – Rising Down (Def Jam/IDJMG)
Young Jeezy – The Recession (Corporate Thugz/Def Jam/IDJMG)
Brutha – Brutha (Goodfellas/Def Jam/IDJMG)
Sterling Simms – Yours, Mine & The Truth (One Records/Def Jam/IDJMG)

2009
Rihanna – Good Girl Gone Bad: The Remixes (SRP/Def Jam/IDJMG)
The-Dream – Love vs. Money (Radio Killa/Def Jam/IDJMG)
Jadakiss – The Last Kiss (Ruff Ryders/D-Block/Roc-A-Fella/Def Jam/IDJMG)
Rick Ross – Deeper Than Rap (Maybach Music/Poe Boy/Def Jam/IDJMG)
Method Man & Redman – Blackout! 2 (Def Jam/IDJMG)
Chrisette Michele – Epiphany (Island Def Jam Music Group)
Electrik Red – How to Be a Lady: Volume 1 (Def Jam Records/Radio Killa/IDJMG)
Fast Life Yungstaz – Jamboree (Def Jam Records/IDJMG)
Willy Northpole – Tha Connect (DTP/Def Jam/IDJMG)
Unladylike – Certified (Voicez Music Group/Def Jam/IDJMG)
Ace Hood – Ruthless (We the Best/Def Jam/IDJMG)
Jeremih – Jeremih (Def Jam/IDJMG)
Fabolous – Loso's Way (Desert Storm/Def Jam/IDJMG)
Lil Ru – 21 & Up (Def Jam/IDJMG)
Mariah Carey – Memoirs of an Imperfect Angel (Island/IDJMG)
Playaz Circle – Flight 360: The Takeoff (DTP/Def Jam/IDJMG)
Ghostface Killah – Ghostdini: The Wizard of Poetry In Emerald City (Def Jam/IDJMG)
Triple C's – Custom Cars & Cycles (Maybach Music Group/Def Jam/IDJMG)
Amerie – In Love & War (Feenix Rising/Def Jam/IDJMG)
Rihanna – Rated R (SRP/Def Jam/IDJMG)

2010
Kanye West – VH1 Storytellers (Roc-A-Fella/Def Jam/IDJMG)
Ludacris – Battle of the Sexes (DTP/Def Jam/IDJMG)
Meth, Ghost & Rae – Wu-Massacre (Def Jam/IDJMG)
Nas & Damian Marley – Distant Relatives (Universal Republic/IDJMG)
Rihanna – Rated R: The Remixes (SRP/Def Jam/IDJMG)
The Roots – How I Got Over (Def Jam/IDJMG)
The-Dream – Love King (Radio Killa/Def Jam/IDJMG)
Big Boi – Sir Lucious Left Foot: The Son of Chico Dusty (Def Jam/IDJMG)
Curren$y – Pilot Talk (DD172/BluRoc/Def Jam/IDJMG)
Rick Ross – Teflon Don (Maybach Music/Def Jam/IDJMG)
Fabolous – There Is No Competition 2: The Grieving Music EP (Desert Storm/Def Jam/IDJMG)
Jeremih – All About You (Def Jam/IDJMG)
Rihanna – Loud (SRP/Def Jam/IDJMG)
Kanye West – My Beautiful Dark Twisted Fantasy (Roc-A-Fella/Def Jam/IDJMG) 
Ne-Yo – Libra Scale (Def Jam/IDJMG) 
Curren$y – Pilot Talk II (DD172/BluRoc/Def Jam/IDJMG)
Ronald Isley – Mr. I (Def Soul/IDJMG)
Chrisette Michele – Let Freedom Reign (Def Jam/IDJMG)
Redman – Reggie (Def Jam/IDJMG)
Sheek Louch – Donnie G: Don Gorilla (D-Block/Def Jam/IDJMG)
Ghostface Killah – Apollo Kids (Def Jam/IDJMG)

2011

2012
 Big K.R.I.T. – Live from the Underground (Cinematic Music Group/Def Jam)
 Frank Ocean – Channel Orange (Def Jam)
 Nas – Life Is Good (The Jones Experience/Def Jam)
 Rick Ross – God Forgives, I Don't (Maybach Music/Def Jam)
 2 Chainz – Based on a T.R.U. Story (Def Jam)
 G.O.O.D. Music – Cruel Summer (G.O.O.D. Music/Def Jam)
 Rihanna – Unapologetic (SRP/Def Jam)
 Big Boi – Vicious Lies and Dangerous Rumors (Purple Ribbon/Def Jam)
 The-Dream – Terius Nash: 1977 (Radio Killa/Def Jam)

2013
 Trinidad James – Don't Be S.A.F.E. (Gold Gang/Def Jam/IDJMG)
 Fast & Furious 6 (Original Motion Picture Soundtrack) (Def Jam/IDJMG)
 The-Dream – IV Play (Radio Killa/Def Jam/IDJMG)
 Chrisette Michele – Better (Motown/IDJMG)
 Kanye West – Yeezus (Roc-A-Fella/Def Jam/IDJMG)
 August Alsina – Downtown: Life Under the Gun (Radio Killa/Def Jam/IDJMG)
 Big Sean – Hall of Fame (G.O.O.D. Music/Def Jam/IDJMG)
 2 Chainz – B.O.A.T.S. II: Me Time (Def Jam/IDJMG)
 Pusha T – My Name Is My Name (G.O.O.D. Music/Def Jam/IDJMG)
 Jhené Aiko – Sail Out (Artium/Def Jam/IDJMG)

2014
 Rick Ross – Mastermind (Maybach Music/Def Jam)
 YG – My Krazy Life (Pu$haz Ink/Corporate Thugz/Def Jam/IDJMG)
 August Alsina – Testimony (Radio Killa/Def Jam/IDJMG)
 Afrojack – Forget the World (Wall/PM:AM/Def Jam/IDJMG)
 The Roots – …And Then You Shoot Your Cousin (Def Jam/IDJMG)
 Mariah Carey – Me. I Am Mariah... The Elusive Chanteuse (Def Jam/IDJMG)
 Common – Nobody's Smiling (Artium/Def Jam/IDJMG)
 Iggy Azalea – The New Classic (Mercury/IDJMG)
 Young Jeezy – Seen It All: The Autobiography (Corporate Thugz/Def Jam/IDJMG)
 Jhené Aiko – Souled Out (Artium/Def Jam/IDJMG)
 Lacrim – Corleone (Def Jam France/IDJMG)
 Elijah Blake – Drift (Artium/Def Jam/IDJMG)
 Vince Staples – Hell Can Wait (Artium/Def Jam/IDJMG)
 Logic – Under Pressure (Visionary/Def Jam/IDJMG)
 Teyana Taylor – VII (G.O.O.D. Music/Def Jam/IDJMG)
 Big K.R.I.T. – Cadillactica (Cinematic Music Group/Def Jam/IDJMG)
 Rick Ross – Hood Billionaire (Maybach Music/Def Jam/IDJMG) 
 Iggy Azalea – Reclassified (Mercury/IDJMG)
 YG – Blame It On the Streets (Pu$haz Ink/Corporate Thugz/Def Jam/IDJMG)
 Ludacris – Burning Bridges (DTP/Def Jam/IDJMG)
 Fabolous – The Young OG Project (Desert Storm/Def Jam/IDJMG)

Albums directly through Universal Music

2015
 Big Sean – Dark Sky Paradise (G.O.O.D. Music/Def Jam)
 Ludacris – Ludaversal (DTP/Def Jam)
 Alesso – FOREVER (Refune Music/Def Jam)
 Lil Durk – Remember My Name (OTF/Def Jam)
 Tamia – Love Life (Plus 1/Def Jam)
 Elijah Blake – Shadows & Diamonds (Artium/Def Jam)
 Vince Staples – Summertime '06 (Artium/Def Jam)
 Krept & Konan – The Long Way Home (Def Jam/Virgin EMI)
 Gunplay – Living Legend (Bilderburg/Maybach Music/Def Jam)
 Alessia Cara – Four Pink Walls (EP Entertainment/Def Jam)
 Leona Lewis – I Am (Def Jam/Island)
 Kacy Hill – BLOO (G.O.O.D. Music/Def Jam)
 The Braxtons - Braxton Family Christmas
 Justin Bieber – Purpose (School Boy/RBMG/Def Jam) 
 Young Jeezy – Church In These Streets (Corporate Thugz/Def Jam) 
 Logic – The Incredible True Story (Visionary/Def Jam) 
 Alessia Cara – Know It All (EP Entertainment/Def Jam)
 Jadakiss – Top 5 Dead or Alive (D-Block/Def Jam)
 Jeremih – Late Nights (Mick Schultz/Def Jam)
 Rick Ross – Black Market (Maybach Music/Def Jam) 
 Babyface – Return of the Tender Lover (Def Jam)
 August Alsina – This Thing Called Life (NNTME/Def Jam)
 Pusha T – King Push – Darkest Before Dawn: The Prelude (G.O.O.D. Music/Def Jam)

2016
 Kanye West – The Life of Pablo (GOOD/Def Jam)
 HXLT – HXLT (GOOD/Def Jam)
 2 Chainz – ColleGrove (TRU/Def Jam)
 TWENTY88 – TWENTY88 (ARTium/GOOD/Def Jam)
 Bibi Bourelly – Free the Real (Pt. 1) (Def Jam)
 YG – Still Brazy (4Hunnid/CTE World/Def Jam)
 Desiigner - New English (Spirit Preach/GOOD/Def Jam)
 Lil Durk – 2X (OTF/Def Jam)
 Frank Ocean – Endless (Fresh Produce/Def Jam)
 Vince Staples – Prima Donna (Blacksmith/ARTium/Def Jam)
 Troi Irons – Turbulence (Circa 13/Def Jam)
 Jeezy – Trap or Die 3 (YJ Music/Def Jam)
 YG - Red Friday (4Hunnid/CTE World/Def Jam)
 Common – Black America Again (ARTium/Def Jam)
 Def Jam Presents Direct Deposit, Vol. 1

2017
 Big Sean – I Decided (GOOD/Def Jam)
 Amir Obè – None of the Clocks Work (Def Jam)
 Logic – ΞVERYBODY (Visionary/Def Jam)
 Axwell Λ Ingrosso – More Than You Know - EP (Axtone/Def Jam)
 2 Chainz – Pretty Girls Like Trap Music (TRU/Def Jam) 
 Vince Staples – Big Fish Theory (Blacksmith/Def Jam) 
 Kacy Hill – Like a Woman (GOOD/Def Jam)
 Dave East – Paranoia: A True Story (Mass Appeal/Def Jam)
 DaniLeigh - Summer With Friends (Def Jam)
 Jhené Aiko – Trip (Art Club/Def Jam)
 Big Sean & Metro Boomin' - Double or Nothing (Boominati/GOOD/Def Jam/Republic)
 Tee Grizzley & Lil Durk – Bloodas (Only The Family/300/Def Jam)
 Jeezy - Pressure (YJ Music/Agency 99/Def Jam)
 Payroll Giovanni & Cardo - Big Bossin Vol. 1.5 (Def Jam)
 Def Jam Presents Direct Deposit, Vol. 2
 Ai - Wa to Yo (EMI/Def Jam)

2018
 Dave East - Paranoia 2 (From The Dirt/Mass Appeal/Def Jam)
 Payroll Giovanni & Cardo - Big Bossin, Vol. 2 (Def Jam)
 2 Chainz - The Play Don't Care Who Makes It (Gamebread/Def Jam)
 Valee - GOOD Job, You Found Me (GOOD/Def Jam)
 Logic - Bobby Tarantino II (Visionary/Def Jam)
 Jeremih - The Chocolate Box - EP (Def Jam)
 Toni Braxton - Sex & Cigarettes (Def Jam)
 070 Shake - Glitter (GOOD/Def Jam)
 Desiigner - L.O.D. (GOOD/Def Jam)
 Various Artists - Rapture (Music from the Netflix Original TV Series) (Netflix/Def Jam)
 Pusha T - Daytona (GOOD/Def Jam)
 Kanye West - Ye (GOOD/Def Jam)
 Kids See Ghosts - Kids See Ghosts (GOOD/Def Jam)
 Nas - Nasir (Mass Appeal/Def Jam)
 Teyana Taylor -  K.T.S.E.  (GOOD/Def Jam)
 Bobby Sessions - RVLTN (Chapter 1): The Divided States Of AmeriKKKa (High Standardz/Def Jam)
 K. Roosevelt - K. Roosevelt (Def Jam)
 YG -  Stay Dangerous  (4Hunnid/Def Jam)
 Amir Obè – Can't Be A  Here: Chapter 1 (Def Jam)
 Logic - Young Sinatra IV (Visionary/Def Jam)
 Beau Young Prince - Groovy Land (Def Jam)
 Dave East & Styles P – Beloved  (From The Dirt/Mass Appeal/Def Jam)
 Amir Obè – Can't Be A  Here: Chapter 2 (Def Jam)
 Various Artists - The Hate U Give (Original Motion Picture Soundtrack) (Def Jam)
 Fetty Luciano - Story To Tell (Def Jam)
 MihTy - MihTy (Def Jam/Atlantic)
 Vince Staples - FM! (Def Jam)
 Amir Obè – Can't Be A  Here: Chapter 3 (Def Jam)
 Bobby Sessions - RVLTN (Chapter 2): The Art of Resistance (High Standardz/Def Jam)
 2 Chainz - Hot Wings Are a Girl's Best Friend (Gamebread/Def Jam)
 Alessia Cara - The Pains of Growing (EP/Def Jam)
 DaniLeigh - The Plan (Def Jam)
 TJ Porter - Pregame (Def Jam)
 YFL Kelvin - Outta Here (Def Jam)

2019
 Boston George & Diego - Boston George & Diego (YJ Music/Def Jam)
 TJ Porter - No Disturbance EP (Def Jam)
 2 Chainz - Rap or Go to the League (Gamebread/Def Jam)
 Various Artists - Undisputed (Def Jam)
 Bernard Jabs - COLD HEARTED (Def Jam)
 Cosha TG - Summer Nights (Mosley/Def Jam)
 Maxo - LIL BIG MAN (Def Jam)
 Suzi Wu - Error 404 (Def Jam)
 Logic - Supermarket (Visionary/Def Jam)
 Hit-Boy & SOB X RBE - Family Not a Group (Def Jam)
 Sneakk - Say Less (Def Jam)
 Logic - Confessions of a Dangerous Mind (Visionary/Def Jam)
 10k.Caash - The Creator (Def Jam)
 YG - 4REAL 4REAL (4Hunnid/Def Jam)
 S3nsi Molly & Lil Brook - Dumb Shit: The Album (Def Jam)
 Nimic Revenue - Lifeline EP (Def Jam)
 TJ Porter - Voice of the Trenches (Def Jam)
 Valee - Runnin' Rich (GOOD/Def Jam)
 Nas - The Lost Tapes 2 (Mass Appeal/Def Jam)
 Pvrx - 3.14 (Def Jam)
 Nasaan - Kiss of Karma (Def Jam)
 Jeezy - TM104: The Legend of the Snowman (YJ Music/Def Jam)
 Landstrip Chip - From My Point Of View: Reloaded (Def Jam)
 Alessia Cara - This Summer (Def Jam)
 Yung Tory - Still Here (Mosley/Def Jam)
 Goon des Garcons - Cheers To The End Of The World (Def Jam)
 YK Osiris - The Golden Child (Def Jam)
 Kanye West - Jesus Is King (GOOD/Def Jam)
 Dave East - Survival (From The Dirt/Mass Appeal/Def Jam)
 Kaash Paige - Parked Car Convos (Kaash Paige LLC/Def Jam)
 Fredo Bang - Pain Made Me Numb (Bang Biz Ent./Def Jam)
 Nimic Revenue - Lifeline Reloaded (Def Jam)
 Fabolous - Summertime Shootout 3: Coldest Summer Ever (Desert Storm/Def Jam)
 DaniLeigh - My Present (Def Jam)
 Ai - Kansha!!!!! - Thank You for 20 Years New and Best (EMI/Def Jam)

2020
 070 Shake - Modus Vivendi (GOOD/Def Jam)
 10k.Caash - Planet Swajjur
 John Lindahl - Opening Night (BobbyBoy/Def Jam)
 Justin Bieber - Changes (RBMG/Def Jam)
 Jadakiss - Ignatius (So Raspy/D-Block/Def Jam)
 Jhené Aiko - Chilombo (ArtClub/Def Jam)
 MAJ - Majestic (Electric Feel/Def Jam)
 Fredo Bang - Most Hated (Se Lavi/Def Jam)
 Trouble - Thug Luv (Eardruma/Def Jam)
 Bino Rideaux - OUTSIDE (Out The Blue/Do What You Love/Def Jam)
 John Lindahl - Opening Night: The Complete Score (BobbyBoy/Def Jam)
 Teyana Taylor - The Album (GOOD/Def Jam)
 Nasty C & DJ Whoo Kid - Zulu : Mixtape (Def Jam/ Capitol Records)
 Alessia Cara - This Summer: Live off the Floor (Def Jam)
 Logic - No Pressure (Visionary/Def Jam)
 Dave East - Karma 3 (Mass Appeal/Def Jam)
 Bobby Sessions - RVLTH (Chapter 3) : The Price of Freedom (Def Jam)
 Fredo Bang - In the Name Of Gee (Se Lavi/Def Jam) 
 Public Enemy - What You Gonna Do When the Grid Goes Down? (Def Jam) 
 YG - My Life 4Hunnid (4Hunnid/Def Jam)
 Saint Bodhi - Mad World (Def Jam)
 Kaash Paige - Teenage Fever
 John Lindahl - A John Lindahl Holiday (Elysium/Def Jam)
 Big Sean - Detroit 2 (GOOD/Def Jam)
 2 Chainz - So Help Me God! (Gamebread/Def Jam)
 DaniLeigh - MOVIE
 Jeezy - The Recession 2 (YJ Music/Def Jam)
 Alessia Cara - Holiday Stuff (Def Jam)
 Ai - It's All Me, Vol. 1 (EMI/Def Jam)
 Nasty C - Zulu Man with Some Power (Def Jam/ Universal Recordings)

2021

 Alessia Cara - In the Meantime (EP/Def Jam)
Blade Runner: Black Lotus (Soundtrack) (22:10/Def Jam)
Fredo Bang - Still Most Hated (Se Lavi/Def Jam)
Tyhzaei - Noir (Def Jam)
 Various Artists - Coming 2 America (Amazon Studios/Def Jam)
Jhené Aiko - Sailing Soul(s): 2021 version (ArtClub/Def Jam)
Justin Bieber - Justice (Def Jam)
Logic - Bobby Tarantino III (Bobby Boy/Visionary/Def Jam)
DMX - Exodus (Def Jam)
Bobby Sessions - Manifest (Def Jam)
Goon des Garcon - Sheesh!
Fredo Bang - Murder Made Me (Se Lavi/Def Jam)
Roddy Rackzz - Realest Richest Youngin
Kanye West - Donda (GOOD/Def Jam)
Big Sean and Hit-Boy - What You Expect (FF to Def/HS87/Def Jam)
Snoop Dogg Presents Algorithm (Doggy Style/Def Jam)
Saint Bodhi - Antisocial
La the Goat - 813 Day (So So Def/Def Jam)
Ai - It's All Me, Vol. 2 (EMI/Def Jam)

2022 
 2 Chainz - Dope Don't Sell Itself (T.R.U./Gamebread/Def Jam)
 Ai - Dream (EMI/Def Jam)
 Kajo - Cold Places (Elysium/Def Jam)
 Queens: Music from the ABC Original Series (Season One)
 The Women of Def Jam
 Jeremih - Late Nights with Jeremih (anniversary re-release)
 Fredo Bang Two-Face Bang 2 (Se Lavi/Def Jam)
 Pusha T - It's Almost Dry (GOOD/Def Jam)
 070 Shake - You Can't Kill Me (GOOD/Def Jam) 
 Logic - Vinyl Days (Visionary/Def Jam)
 YBN Nahmir - Faster Car Music (Def Jam)
 YG - I Got Issues (4Hunnid/Def Jam)
 Jeezy & DJ Drama - Snofall (YJ Music/Def Jam)
 Fredo Bang - UNLV (Se Lavi/Def Jam)
 Various Artists - Black Panther: Wakanda Forever – Music from and Inspired By (Roc Nation/Hollywood/Def Jam)
 Nasty C -  Ivyson Army Tour Mixtape

References

Notes

External links 
 Def Jam Recordings at Discogs

Discographies of American record labels
Discography
Hip hop discographies